

This is a list of the National Register of Historic Places listings in Salt Lake City, Utah.

This is intended to be a complete list of the properties and districts on the National Register of Historic Places in Salt Lake City, Utah, United States. Latitude and longitude coordinates are provided for many National Register properties and districts; these locations may be seen together in an online map.

There are more than 350 properties and districts listed on the National Register in Salt Lake County, including 6 National Historic Landmarks. 228 of these sites, including 4 National Historic Landmarks, are located in Salt Lake City, and are listed here; the remaining sites, including 2 National Historic Landmarks, are listed separately. Another 17 sites in the city were once listed, but have since been removed.

Current listings

|}

Former listings

|}

See also

 List of National Historic Landmarks in Utah
 National Register of Historic Places listings in Utah

References

History of Salt Lake City
Salt Lake City
Salt Lake City, Utah